Henry Stanley Benedict (February 20, 1878 – July 10, 1930) was an American lawyer and politician who served briefly as a U.S. Representative from California from 1916 to 1917.

Biography
Benedict was born in Boonville, Missouri in 1878 and moved with his parents to Los Angeles, California in 1888. He attended grammar and high school in Los Angeles and then went on to attend the University of Southern California College of Law in Los Angeles, California. Benedict was admitted to the bar in 1910 and began practicing law in Los Angeles, California.

He served as a member of the California State Assembly from 1910 to 1914, and a member of the California State Senate from 1914 to 1916.

A Republican, Benedict was elected to the Sixty-fourth Congress to fill the vacancy caused by the resignation of United States Representative William D. Stephens (November 7, 1916 – March 3, 1917). He was nominated by the Progressive Party for the Sixty-fifth Congress but withdrew in favor of the Republican nominee.

Throughout his political career, Benedict continued to practice law and also engaged in banking. He served as member of the California State Board of Control from 1919 to 1921 and as a member of the California State Railroad Commission from 1921 to 1923.

Benedict died on July 10, 1930, in London, England while there on a visit. He was interred in Forest Lawn Memorial Park in Glendale, California.

References

External links

Join California Henry Stanley Benedict

1878 births
1930 deaths
USC Gould School of Law alumni
Republican Party California state senators
Republican Party members of the California State Assembly
Republican Party members of the United States House of Representatives from California
California Progressives (1912)
20th-century American politicians